Agyneta trifurcata is a species of sheet weaver found in Finland and Russia. It was described by Hippa & Oksala in 1985.

They are often found in birch forests.

References

trifurcata
Spiders described in 1985
Spiders of Europe
Spiders of Asia
Spiders of Russia